The Carthage Punic Ports were the old ports of the city of Carthage that were in operation during ancient times. Carthage was first and foremost  a thalassocracy, that is, a power that was referred to as an Empire of the Seas, whose primary force was based on the scale of its trade. The Carthaginians, however, were not the only ones to follow that policy of control over the seas, since several of the people in those times "lived by and for the sea".

Carthage or Qart Hadasht (New City) was a product of eastern colonization, having its origin in the daughter of Dido, the king of the city of Tyre. According to her legend recorded in the Aeneid, this Tyrian princess was the founder and first queen of the city in 814 B.C. (the most widely accepted date).

Since Utica was founded around 1100 B.C., Carthage is not considered the first Phoenician colony on the North African coast. Beyond its origin, the city largely controlled the entire western basin of the Mediterranean Sea and developed its African hinterland, only reaching its end when it had to face the Roman Republic, an emerging power that caused its ultimate downfall.

Due to its identity, Carthage was an anchor point between the two basins of the Mediterranean; the eastern part, known as the cradle of Phoenicia, and the western part, which was the place of its expansion and downfall.

The ports of such a city, which were the most important point of communication with the outside world, are therefore of fundamental importance in the history of Carthage in this context. Their history was documented by an important source; Appian, a historian of Ancient Greece who lived in the 2nd century B.C. Despite his description, the location of the ports was the work of archaeological excavations begun in the 1970s.

Sources and location issues

Ports location in Phoenician cities 

The Phoenicians did not entrust to luck the choice of a new colony in a particular place. The location of the new settlement had to respond to a series of peculiar requirements, related to its defence and above all to its port characteristics. It was necessary that cargo ships could easily enter the port and that the opposing wind did not make access to the port impossible. To this end, the choice of the cape was particularly important. In addition, the location of the port, due to its physical characteristics, had to offer an easy defence so the settlers only had to increase the natural defences to ensure security.

The location of the New City responded particularly well to the two requirements. The embarkation area was formidably protected thanks to the opportune location of the Sidi Bou Saïd promontory, the city itself in stricto sensu. It was located on the outside of the seafront, between two stretches of water (today's Lake of Tunis and Sebkha Ariana), and the interior was intercepted by a succession of hills, which formed a natural defensive line.

Ports location in Carthage 
The matter of the Carthage ports' location has been one of the most discussed in Punic historiography. By observation alone, the two present-day lagoons —one circular and the other rectangular— both joined by a thin string and identified as the ports of Carthage at the beginning of the 19th century by Chateaubriand, could not be the ports that had harboured the fleet of "Rome's greatest enemy" in the historians' minds.

The recent excavations carried out in the sector during the UNESCO international campaign (a series of American excavations carried out near the rectangular lagoon and English excavations carried out in the circular lagoon) confirmed the Punic origin of the lagoons, dating them to the 2nd century B.C. This dating was possible thanks to the discovery of ceramic remains, particularly in the excavations carried out in the carena coves.

However, the original port that was used during the first five centuries of the Punic history of the North African city has yet to be located, and it is not even known whether or not this port was located on the site of the lagoons. In the first two centuries of its existence, Carthage had no more port facilities than any other colony in the Mediterranean, as it merely had a place from which ships were to be launched. No visible traces of such places have remained, since they have been eliminated by later installations or by radical changes in the local topography.

The matter of the Carthage ports' location has been linked to the history and topography of the place. It is known that the location of the city concerning the shore evolved a lot over the centuries and that during ancient times a process of polderization took place, consisting of a human action that was coupled to the transport of sediments from the Bagradas river, moved there due to ocean currents.

American excavations have shown that the Salambó tofet was probably unhealthy at that time, which suggests that the primitive port sector was probably located in that area.

Archaeological excavations have uncovered the traces of a canal that suggest that it functioned until its filling in the 4th century B.C. The canal in question can be followed archaeologically for about 400 m, having been built on natural terrain. Some historians have suggested that there is a link with the Lake of Tunis due to the nature of the sediments found. Serge Lancel has also documented that the level of Lake Tunis was significantly higher than in the ancient period of the city, and mentions its shores as a probable place of refuge. According to this theory, the canal was a "line of penetration" into the interior of the city. It is also assumed that there could have been a second canal parallel to the first. On the edges of these facilities would have been the naval dockyards. The hangars, stores and temples would be erected nearby, constituting the "emporium". It is important to note that, due to the nature of the Punic civilization, its relationship with the sea was fundamental and that the centre of the city, the agora, shouldn't have been located far from its economic centre. Experts have theorized that the canal was not used for navigation, but for landing in an area particularly hostile to human presence. The location of the Tofet of Salambo, in the vicinity of the centre of the original Phoenician colony, is a clear sign of this possible hostility according to the sections that have been discovered, dating from the 8th century BC.

There have been many discrepancies among the experts about the location of the primitive ports of Carthage. By analogy with other places, and taking into account the need to avoid unfavourable winds, the possible location of one of the ports is placed in the vicinity of the area of the Baths of Antoninus, towards the north of the site, that is, towards the southern area of Le Kram. The discoveries made at the site suggest that this first location is very likely since the Roman baths used to be located on land reclaimed from the sea. Therefore, in this area could have been located one of the primitive ports of the city. Certain historians believe, however, that the site of the primitive port was in the vicinity of the village of Sidi Bou Saïd, because of its location near a cape, which gave it a privileged geographical position so important in the eyes of the Phoenicians. Other experts, including Serge Lancel, placed the position of the ports along the Lake of Tunis, less assembled in ancient times than nowadays. Lancel places the position of the port on the beaches of Marsa, at a relative distance from the city (about 3 km approximately), but close enough to the neighbourhood of Megara.

Regardless, it becomes essential to focus on the observation of the structures of which traces are preserved to see if it is possible to contrast their existence with ancient sources and thus obtain an approximate date of their construction.

Military and commercial port

Description of Appian 
Appian, an author of the 2nd century A.D., was based on the work of Polybius, who witnessed the downfall of the city of Dido, and whose text has been lost. His description is very important, even if it sometimes raises more questions than answers. It is a text that deals with specific topics of ancient history.

In addition to the two dársenas surrounded by fortifications, Appian also mentions a large breakwater and a large foreshore.

The present site of the circular lagoon has an area of about eight hectares, the other lagoon is about twice as large. The commercial port was connected to the sea by a canal, which must have flowed into the present-day Kram Bay, of which no remains exist.

Appian cites the term "cothon" to designate the ports, a word of Semitic origin that designates an artificial dársena created by men. Such spaces are relatively well known in other Punic cities, such as Motya, in Sicily, or Mahdia, in Tunisia. Strabo also provides data on the distance from the Carthage Ports to Cape Lillibaeus, a promontory southeast of Sicily, which he estimates at 1500 stadia (277.5 km). The literary tradition has been verified by archaeology. Archaeologists have made models reconstructing the archaeological site in the different epochs of the city's history. These models are exhibited in the small museum of the Admiralty Islet.

Admiralty Islet 

At first glance, it is difficult to identify the circular lagoon as the circular port of ancient Carthage in which a fleet that shook the western Mediterranean basin was sheltered.

A priori it is difficult to see how they could have had 220 ships there, such as the quinqueremes, ships with five oarsmen divided into three rows. However, British excavations have revealed that the circular lagoon was the military port and that the navarch's flag must have been on the islet. Punic ports have been found, particularly the ramps of the dársena levees or dry docks for wintering. The ramps had a slightly sloping beaten earth floor. These dársenas were undoubtedly the warehouses fitted out to accommodate the ships mentioned by Strabo.

The archaeological remains uncovered made it possible to extrapolate the site's reception capacity: 30 levees on the circular islet and 135 to 140 levees around the perimeter. In total, 160 to 170 levees could accommodate as many warships as have been identified. Below the dársena levees were located the storage spaces. It has been assumed that each levee could accommodate two rows of ships. In the middle of the circular islet was an open space, next to which stood a tower, which is likely to be the tower of the navarch mentioned by Appian.

It has been pointed out that the levees could have served mainly as a naval shipyard, and that all the ships did not need to be operated at the same time. On the other hand, agglomerations should only take place during winter.

Commercial port 
The two ports were connected by a canal, at the entrance of which, according to another text by Appian, an esplanade was used to store goods. An American mission proceeded to carry out a series of excavations in that area and found the remains of part of a dock dating from the second half of the 3rd century B.C. The excavations also revealed a series of port facilities: docks and hangars, which were in the vicinity of the commercial port.

A channel led from the port to the sea and ended near the foreshore, called "Falbe's quadrilateral", after the name of the 19th century Danish archaeologist who was the first to study it. The foreshore communicated with the maritime wall of the 2nd century B.C. A careful study led to classify this space as an embankment or "chôma". In connection with the text of Appian, one can certainly recognize, in this embankment, the space for manoeuvring, unloading and storage that protected the entrance from the prevailing winds. It was perhaps in these places where the Roman army set foot during the Third Punic War, constituting the bridgehead from which the final assault started.

Conclusion

Role of ports during the downfall of Carthage 
The organization of the Carthage Punic Ports in its last epoch was arranged in such a costly way and directed with an ambition based on a renewed force that violated the peace signed in 201 B.C., provoking the Roman Senate to use force against the Carthaginians.

Located at the southern end of the city, the ports of the city were protected by a device of walls notably lighter than the one protecting the isthmus, since the Carthaginians were confident of their naval superiority. Carthage thought it was impossible for them to receive an attack from the sea, as they were prepared to repel any incursion. The final assault led by the Roman general Publius Cornelius Scipio Aemilianus came, however, from the harbour quarter (146 BC). Setting fire to the levees in the eastern part of the commercial port, Scipio seized the military port threatening the agora. This attack occurred in the final assault on the hill of Byrsa. The situation of the ports suffered the same fate as the rest of the city after its fall and were subsequently used during the Roman domination.

Ports location in Roman times 

The Admiralty Islet during Roman rule was occupied by a public square enclosed by columns. On it were erected a temple and an octagonal building, whose use is unknown. The mercantile activities that took place in the Carthage commercial port during Roman control were fundamental for the provisioning of Rome.

In 306 the city suffered an earthquake that severely devastated the littoral zone. This earthquake was so strong that it took a long time for the city to recover from the disaster. Although port activities continued, the topography of the site had changed extensively.

What happened to the ports 
The complexity of this issue has been clarified, although many areas remain obscure. Serge Lancel quotes Cicero, who speaks of the destruction of Carthage in this way in his work (De lege agraria, II, 32, 87), despite the fact that "it had strong walls and was surrounded by ports".

The places where ports should be located depends on their orientation to the winds, which would notably influence their use. The places recognized as the possible locations of the ports are the following:
 An inlet mentioned by Hamilcar Barca.
 A dársena between the cove of Hamilcar and the hill of Bordj Djedid.
 An inlet close to the area where the Baths of Antoninus are located, called "Quadrilateral of Roquefeuil".

The vast beaches of La Marsa could also represent the merchant landing sites that were so characteristic of the daily life of the Punic capital. On this shore, still battered by the African winds, one can imagine the arrival of the ships owned by the proud merchants from the East.

Notes

References

Bibliography

External links 
 Jean-François Coustillière, " Les ports puniques de Carthage ("The Punic ports of Cartago")", Cols Bleus, n°1989, May 21, 1988 (In French)
 The Punic arsenal of Carthage (Network of Historical Arsenals of the Mediterranean) (In French)
 Carthage as seen by satellite (Google Earth) (In French)
 Aerial photograph by Yann Arthus-Bertrand (In French)
 Ports of Carthage in Historialago.com (In Spanish)

History of Tunisia
Monuments and memorials in Tunisia
Ports and harbours